Tarache augustipennis, the narrow-winged midget, is a moth of the family Noctuidae. The species was first described by Augustus Radcliffe Grote in 1875. It is found in North America from Manitoba to south-western British Columbia, south to Arizona and east to Texas.

The habitat consists of fens, bogs, foothill valleys and riparian woodlands in arid grasslands.

The wingspan is 23–30 mm. Adults are on from May to August in the north.

External links

"Therasea flavicosta (Smith 1900)". Moths of North Dakota. Retrieved November 12, 2020.

Acontiinae
Moths of North America
Taxa named by Augustus Radcliffe Grote
Moths described in 1875